Harvey Daniel Lintott (born 20 February 2003) is an English professional footballer who plays as a defender for EFL League Two club Northampton Town.

Career
After playing youth football with the club, Lintott signed a professional contract with Gillingham in April 2021. He made his debut for the club on 10 August 2021 in a 2–2 EFL Cup draw with Crawley Town and scored the winning penalty of a 10–9 shoot-out victory. Lintott was released at the end of the 2021–22 season following the club's relegation.

On 11 July 2022, Lintott joined EFL League Two club Northampton Town on an initial one-year deal with the option for a further year following a successful trial period.

Career statistics

References

External links

2003 births
Living people
English footballers
Association football defenders
Gillingham F.C. players
Northampton Town F.C. players
English Football League players